Francesco Petruccione AAS,ASSAf is a renowned physicist and academic leader, currently serving as a professor of Physics at Stellenbosch University and the interim director of the National Institute for Theoretical and Computational Sciences (NITheCS). With a wealth of experience in his field, he previously held the position of professor and Pro Vice-Chancellor of Big Data and Informatics at the University of KwaZulu-Natal (UKZN). Petruccione is also a highly regarded member of the Academy of Science of South Africa and a Fellow of the Royal Society of South Africa.

Early life and education 

Francesco Petruccione was born in Genoa, Italy, in 1961. He pursued his undergraduate studies in physics at the University of Freiburg, Germany, where he earned his first degree in the field. Petruccione continued his academic journey at the same institution, earning his doctorate in 1988 and his Habilitation degree (Dr. rer. nat. habil.) in 1994.

Career 

Francesco Petruccione has had a distinguished career in the field of Physics. In 2004, he became a professor of Theoretical Physics at the University of KwaZulu-Natal and was awarded an Innovation Fund grant the following year to establish a Centre for Quantum Technology. Petruccione went on to hold the position of South African Research Chair for Quantum Information Processing and Communication Technology in 2007.

In addition to his role as interim director of the National Institute for Theoretical and Computational Science, Petruccione also holds an adjunct professor position at the Korean Advanced Institute for Science and Technology. In 2018, he was appointed Pro Vice-Chancellor of Big Data and Informatics at the University of KwaZulu-Natal (UKZN) before moving to Stellenbosch University in 2022 as a professor of Physics and Quantum Computing as part of the Physics Department and the School of Data Science and Computational Thinking. Petruccione still has ties to the University of KwaZulu-Natal by collaborating with the Quantum Research Group based there.

Petruccione is highly regarded in his field, with an H-index of 49 and a reputation for his groundbreaking work in physics and quantum computing.

Selected publications 

 Francesco Petruccione and Heinz-Peter Breuer: The Theory of Open Quantum Systems.
 Maria Schuld and Francesco Petruccione: Machine Learning with Quantum Computers. 
 Maria Schuld and Francesco Petruccione: Supervised Learning with Quantum Computers
 Heinz-Peter Breuer & Francesco Petruccione:  How to build master equations for complex systems
 Shivani Mahashakti Pillay, Ilya Sinayskiy, Edgar Jembere & Francesco Petruccione:   Implementing Quantum-Kernel-Based Classifiers in the NISQ Era
  Carsten Blank & Francesco Petruccione  Quantum Applications - Fachbeitrag: Vielversprechend: Monte-Carlo-ähnliche Methoden auf dem Quantencomputer
  Lavanya Singh, Ugochukwu J. Anyaneji, Wilfred Ndifon, Neil Turok, Stacey A. Mattison, Richard Lessells, Ilya Sinayskiy, Emmanuel J. San, Houriiyah Tegally, Shaun Barnett, Trevor Lorimer, Francesco Petruccione & Tulio de Oliveira:   Implementation of an efficient SARS-CoV-2 specimen pooling strategy for high throughput diagnostic testing.
  Camille L. Latune, Ilya Sinayskiy & Francesco Petruccione: Roles of quantum coherences in thermal machines.
  M. Schuld, M. Fingerhuth, Francesco Petruccione: Implementing a distance-based classifier with a quantum interference circuit.

External links

References 

Living people
1961 births
University of Freiburg alumni
South African physicists
Academic staff of Stellenbosch University